William Fairchild (sometimes credited as W. E. C. Fairchild) (1918–2000, aged 81-82) was an English author, playwright, director and screenwriter. He was married to actress Isabel Dean from 1953 to the early 1970s, and to producer, agent, and writer Robin Dalton from 1992 until his death.

Selected filmography
A Song for Tomorrow (1948) – story, script
Penny and the Pownall Case (1948) – story, script
Colonel Bogey (1948) – script
 Badger's Green (1949) – script
 Morning Departure (1950) – script
The Long Dark Hall (1951) – additional dialogue
 Outcast of the Islands (1951) – script
The Man with the Gun (1952) – script
Gift Horse (1952) – script
The Net (1953) – script
Malta Story (1953) – script
Front Page Story (1954) – script
The Seekers (1954) – script
Passage Home (1955) – script
John and Julie (1955) – script, original play, director
Value for Money (1955) – script
No Man's Land (1956) (TV) – script, original play
The Extra Day (1956 – script, director
The Silent Enemy (1958) – script, director
The Four Just Men (1959–60) (TV series) – script, director
The Horsemasters (1961) – script, director
199 Park Lane (1965) (TV series) – script, creator
Do Not Disturb (1965) – original play
Star! (1968) – script
The Last Shot You Hear (1969) – original play
Embassy (1972) – script
The Darwin Adventure (1972) – script
The MacKintosh Man (1973) – uncredited writer
The Sound of Murder (1982) – script, original play
Invitation to the Wedding (1985) – script

References

External links

1918 births
2000 deaths
English male screenwriters
20th-century English screenwriters
20th-century English male writers